Neoplasta is a genus of flies in the family Empididae.

Species
N. acuta Collin, 1933
N. alleghani Melander, 1947
N. analis Thomson, 1869
N. basalis Collin, 1933
N. bifida MacDonald & Turner, 1993
N. bivittata Philippi, 1865
N. brevicornis Collin, 1933
N. chrysopleura MacDonald & Turner, 1993
N. cilicauda Collin, 1933
N. concava MacDonald & Turner, 1993
N. coxalis Collin, 1933
N. deyrupi MacDonald & Turner, 1993
N. discreta Collin, 1933
N. excavata Collin, 1933
N. femoralis Bezzi, 1909
N. fortiseta Smith, 1962
N. fregapanii Rafael, 2001
N. hansoni MacDonald & Turner, 1993
N. hebes Melander, 1947
N. megorchis Melander, 1947
N. neblina Rafael, 2001
N. octoterga MacDonald & Turner, 1993
N. parahebes MacDonald & Turner, 1993
N. paramegorchis MacDonald & Turner, 1993
N. scapularis (Loew, 1862)
N. scapuliformis MacDonald & Turner, 1993

References

Empidoidea genera
Empididae
Taxa named by Daniel William Coquillett